State Route 271 (SR 271) is a primary state highway in the U.S. state of Virginia. Known as Pouncey Tract Road, the state highway runs  from U.S. Route 250 (US 250) in Short Pump north to SR 620 and SR 622 in Rockville. A small section of it was first added to the state highway system during 1930, and it gained its current routing and designation by 1940.

Route description

SR 271 begins at an intersection with US 250 (Broad Street) in the suburban community of Short Pump in western Henrico County. The road continues south as Pump Road. The state highway heads north as a four-lane divided highway to the east of Short Pump Town Center and crosses over Interstate 64 (I-64) just west of its western interchange with I-295. SR 271 reduces to a two-lane undivided road north of the overpass and passes along the western edge of the suburban community of Wyndham. The road temporarily becomes a four-lane divided highway again by turning left at its perpendicular intersection with Nuckols Road. SR 271 leaves the suburban area as a two-lane road that cuts through the northeastern corner of Goochland County near the headwaters of the Chickahominy River to the east before entering Hanover County. The state highway continues west to its northern terminus at the intersection of SR 620 and SR 622 in the village of Rockville. SR 622 heads south as Rockville Road and north as Walnut Hill Drive; SR 620 heads west as Dogwood Trail Road.

History
In 1933, it was redesignated State Route 160 as part of that year's state highway renumbering. It received the designation of SR 271 from what is now State Route 84 during the state highway renumbering of 1940, when the latter was renumbered to match with West Virginia Route 84.

Major intersections

References

External links

Virginia Highways Project: VA 431
Virginia Highways Project: VA 160
Virginia Highways Project: VA 271

271
State Route 271
State Route 271
State Route 271